Justine Bartolini-Baldelli (née Pecori-Suárez; ; 27 November 1811 in Florence, Italy – 30 January 1903 in Florence) was a French princess, being the spouse of Prince Jérôme Bonaparte, heir presumptive of France during the second Empire.

Life
Giustina Pecori-Suárez was the daughter of Bernard Pecori (or Percoli). She was first married to the Italian marquess Luigi Bartolini-Baldelli. In her second marriage, she became the third wife of Jérôme Bonaparte, youngest brother of Emperor Napoleon I. They married first in a religious ceremony in Florence in 1840, and a second time in a secret civil ceremony on 19 February 1853 in Paris, France. Her spouse was the heir presumptive to the throne of France of his nephew Napoleon III during their marriage, placing her in a position to become the next Empress of France.
 
At the time of her second marriage, she was a rich widow and Jerome heavily indebted, and the marriage enabled him to pay his debts and continued his luxurious lifestyle in Florence. It was a morganatic marriage upon the request of Jerome, who did not wish to recognize her officially and insisted upon calling her Madame la Marquise and have her referred to as such by others. Baron du Casse described her as beautiful, distinguished, sweet and interested in charity, but also as indolent and languid in her habits. She followed Jerome to France in 1847, and resided with him in Paris with his son. Despite attempts to do so, she did not succeed in being officially recognized. Her step-son, Prince Napoleon, reportedly disliked her and alienated her from her spouse, who also took a mistress. Her stepson and the Corsican steward of Jerome, Pietra-Santa, accused her of an intrigue with the illegitimate son of Jerome, Jerome David. On this occasion, Jerome did not believe the story and had Pietra-Santa fired. In 1853, Jerome was again made Imperial Prince and heir presumptive after his nephew Napoleon III had become emperor. After this, however, he exiled Giustina back to Florence by accusing her of adultery referring to the previous mentioned story. He did, however, repay her the money she had spent on him in Florence, and purchased a palazzo by the Arno for her. In 1860, Giustina was widowed and awarded a pension by Napoleon III.

References
 Leonardo Ginori Lisci: The Florentine palazzi: their history and art, Volym 2. Giunti Barbera, 1985
 Philip Walsingham Sergeant: The burlesque Napoleon: being the story of the life and the kingship of Jerome Napoleon Bonaparte, youngest brother of Napoleon the Great (1905)

House of Bonaparte
1811 births
1903 deaths
Morganatic spouses
Princesses of France (Bonaparte)